Edgemont (also, Spoonville) is a former settlement in Lassen County, California.

The Spoonville post office opened in 1903, changed its name to Edgement in 1913, and closed in 1918. The name Spoonville honored Florella A. Spoon.

References

Former settlements in Lassen County, California
Former populated places in California